Armatocereus rauhii is a tall, branched columnar species of cactus endemic to the north of Peru on the western slopes of the Andes.

Description
The stems have 6–12 ribs.

Taxonomy
The species was first described by Curt Backeberg in 1957. The specific epithet rauhii honours Werner Rauh. Two species described by Friedrich Ritter in 1981, Armatocereus balsasensis and Armatocereus arduus, are included in this species, as synonyms of A. rauhii subsp. balsasensis, by some sources. Other sources maintain A. arduus as a separate species, although noting that its taxonomic status is uncertain.

Subspecies
Armatocereus rauhii subsp. rauhii
Armatocereus rauhii subsp. balsasensis (F.Ritter) Ostolaza – the subspecific epithet refers to the district of Balsas in Peru.

Distribution and habitat
Armatocereus rauhii is endemic to the north of Peru. Within the country, the stated distribution of the species as a whole and of the subspecies varies by source, but centres on the regions of Amazonas, Cajamarca and Lambayeque. It may also include the regions of Ancash and Piura.

Conservation
The 2013 assessment in the IUCN Red List did not differentiate between the subspecies, rating the species as whole as of "least concern". Earlier, A. rauhii subsp. balsasensis was rated as "vulnerable".

References

rauhii
Endemic flora of Peru
Cacti of South America